Melica grandiflora is a species of grass that can be found in Japan, Korea and China.

Description
The main panicle branches are indistinct and almost racemose.

Spikelets are oblong, pendulous and solitary. The pedicels are filiform, curved, and puberulous. Both the upper and lower glumes are keelless, membranous, and oblong. Its palea have thick keels and obtuse apex. Flowers are fleshy, oblong and truncate. The fruits are caryopsis with additional pericarp and linear hilum.

Ecology
Its flowering time is April to July.

References

grandiflora
Grasses of China
Flora of Japan
Flora of Korea